Sally Hadden is an American historian. She is associate professor and the director of graduate studies in the history department at Western Michigan University and the author of Slave Patrols: Law and Violence in Virginia and the Carolinas. Her other books include Signposts: New Directions in Southern Legal History (co-editor with Patricia Minter; University of Georgia Press, 2013), A Companion to American Legal History (co-editor with Alfred Brophy; Wiley Blackwell, 2013), and Traveling the Beaten Path: Charles Tait's Charges to Federal Grand Juries, 1822-1825 (co-author with David Durham and Paul Pruitt; University of Alabama School of Law/University of Alabama Press, 2013).

Education
Hadden attended college at the University of North Carolina-Chapel Hill where she studied history and political science, graduating in 1984. She next attended Harvard University, earning an MA (1985), JD (1989) and PhD (1993). At Harvard, she studied with Bernard Bailyn.

References

Living people
Date of birth missing (living people)
Harvard University alumni
University of North Carolina at Chapel Hill alumni
Western Michigan University faculty
Year of birth missing (living people)